Self-working magic is a commonly used term in magic to refer to tricks that work simply from following a fixed procedure, rather than relying on trickery, sleight-of-hand, or other hidden moves.

Description

The term "self-working" has come into common usage in the world of magic as a reference to tricks that do not require sleight of hand or secret moves. For example, Glenn Gravatt compiled numerous such tricks in his book Encyclopedia of Self-working Card Tricks (1936), which was later compiled with Second Encyclopedia of Card Tricks (1936) to create Jean Hugard's classic text Encyclopedia of Card Tricks in 1937.  Strictly speaking no magic is "self-working", since tricks still need to be performed and presented correctly, and so some writers prefer the term "auto-magic", which was popularized by Michael Breggar in his monthly "Auto-Magic" column in The Linking Ring.

Many self-working card tricks rely on mathematical principles, and can be replicated by following the steps correctly.  A simple example is the trick "Magical 13", where a deck of playing cards is secretly set up with all the suits in order.  Because cards of the same value are exactly 13 away from each other in this prearranged order, the spectator can cut the deck as often as he likes, but when he deals the deck into 13 piles, each pile will consist of four cards with exactly the same value.

Some consider optical illusions and some science demonstrations, where the wonder comes from unexpectedness of a natural phenomenon, to fall into the category of self-working magic as well.

Examples
Some of the best card tricks in the world are self-working, one of the most notable examples being Out Of This World (1942) by Paul Curry.

Many people are first introduced to performing magic via self-working card tricks.  Some of the most widely known self-working card tricks include the Twenty-One Card Trick, The Four Robbers, The Piano Trick, Spectator Cuts To The Aces, The Spelling Bee, The Circus Card Trick, and Do As I Do.

Resources

Classic texts on self-working tricks include Scarne on Card Tricks (1950) by John Scarne, Self-Working Card Tricks (1976) and similar books by Karl Fulves published by Dover Publications, and the Card College Light trilogy by Roberto Giobbi.

References

External links
 Gravatt, Glenn.  Encyclopedia of Self-working Card Tricks (1936)
 Fulves, Karl.  Series on self-working magic: Self-Working Card Tricks (1976), Self-Working Mental Magic (1979), Self-Working Table Magic (1981), Self-Working Number Magic (1983), More Self-Working Card Tricks (1984), Self-Working Paper Magic (1985), Self-Working Handkerchief Magic (1988), Self-Working Coin Magic (1989), Self-Working Rope Magic (1990), Self-Working Close-up Card Magic (1995), New Self-Working Card Tricks (2001), My Best Self-Working Card Tricks (2001).

Magic (illusion)